Paulina Maciuszek (born 2 September 1985 in Rabka-Zdrój) is a Polish cross-country skier who has been competing since 2004. At the 2010 Winter Olympics in Vancouver, she finished sixth in the 4 × 5 km relay, 29th in the 30 km, 45th in the 10 km, and 52nd in the 7.5 km + 7.5 km double pursuit events.

At the FIS Nordic World Ski Championships 2009 in Liberec, Maciuszek finished sixth in the 4 × 5 km relay, 50th in the 30 km, 58th in the 7.5 km + 7.5 km double pursuit, and 61st in the 10 km events.

Her best career finish was ninth in a 4 × 5 km relay in France in 2008 while her best individual finish was 34th at a 10 km event in Estonia in January 2010.

Cross-country skiing results
All results are sourced from the International Ski Federation (FIS).

Olympic Games

World Championships

World Cup

Season standings

References

External links
 

1985 births
Cross-country skiers at the 2010 Winter Olympics
Cross-country skiers at the 2014 Winter Olympics
Living people
Polish female cross-country skiers
Tour de Ski skiers
Olympic cross-country skiers of Poland
People from Rabka-Zdrój
Sportspeople from Lesser Poland Voivodeship